Elizabeth Helen Margosches is an American statistician who worked on risk assessment for the United States Environmental Protection Agency.

Education and career
Margosches graduated from Bryn Mawr College in 1969.
After earning a master's degree at Rutgers University, she earned a second master's degree in public health at the University of Michigan in 1975. She completed her Ph.D. in biostatistics at Michigan in 1980; her dissertation was Nonparametric Tolerance Intervals For Sequential Monitoring.

She joined the Environmental Protection Agency in 1980, after completing her doctorate.

Service
Margosches was president of the Caucus for Women in Statistics for the 1998 term, and chaired the Committee on Women in Statistics of the American Statistical Association in 2005.

Recognition
In 2007, Margosches was elected as a Fellow of the American Statistical Association "for significant impact on scientific policy issues at the Environmental Protection Agency; for recruitment and mentoring of women in government agencies; and for exemplary service to the profession".

References

Year of birth missing (living people)
Living people
American statisticians
Women statisticians
Bryn Mawr College alumni
Rutgers University alumni
University of Michigan School of Public Health alumni
Fellows of the American Statistical Association